The Hardacre Film Festival is a film festival held annually in Tipton, Iowa and is considered to be Iowa's longest-running film festival. The festival was founded in 1997 by Troy Peters and is typically held in August, showing independent films from all over the world.

Awards
The festival traditionally awards filmmakers in nine categories:

 Best Narrative Feature film
 Best Short film
 Best Documentary film
 Best Student Film
 Best Experimental Film
 Best Animated Film
 Troy Peters Best Iowa Film (named after the festival's founder)
 Audience Award

References

External links
 

Film festivals in Iowa
Tourist attractions in Cedar County, Iowa
Film festivals established in 1997
1997 establishments in Iowa